Old Northamptonians Rugby Football Club is a rugby union club located in  Northampton, Northamptonshire. The first XV played in Regional 2 East Midlands in 2022-23, a sixth tier league in the English rugby union system, which replaced the previous Midlands 1 East in September 2022 as part of the RFU's league restructuring.  

In its centenary season, the club won the league with three matches remaining  - at that time, the playing record was Played 19, Won 18, Lost 1, Points for 691, Points against 284, Try bonuses 14, League points 86. Lutterworth and Market Harborough in second and third league placings could no longer secure enough points to take the title.

History

Old Northamptonians Rugby Football Club was founded in 1922/23 by W.C.C. Cooke, who was the headmaster of Northampton Grammar School.  The Old Northamptonians played a fixture on Boxing Day 1922 on Northampton Racecourse against a Northampton Alliance team; the fixture was advertised in the local newspaper, but the result is not recorded.  The fixture will be replayed during the club's centenary season, on Boxing Day 2022, this time at the home ground at Billing Road.

In the early years, ONRFC did not have their own home ground and played their fixtures at Northampton Racecourse.  However in November 1936 the Old Northamptonians Association secured the lease of 17½ acres of previously agricultural land adjoining Billing Road and Park Avenue South, to provide two rugby pitches and one cricket pitch. At the time the club had rugby two teams, and with the establishment of a home ground, aspired to running four rugby teams.  By the end of the 1949/50 season, the club was indeed running four teams, and the Town Planning Committee had approved plans for a clubhouse to be built.

The club has played an important role in developing players who have gone on to play for Northampton Saints, including Tom Collins and James Grayson.  One of the club's most famous former players is Bob Taylor who gained 16 caps for England and 2 caps for the British Lions, as well as becoming President of the RFU in 2007.

Club honours
Regional 2 East Midlands champions: 2022-23
Midlands 3 East (South) champions: 2008-09
East Midlands/Leicestershire 3 champions: 1992–93
East Midlands/Leicestershire 2 champions: 1993–94
East Midlands/Leicestershire 1 champions: 1994–95
Midlands 1 (east v west) winners (2): 2009–10, 2014–15

Old Northamptonians have won the Northampton & District Alliance Cup 22 times, including a run of 14 consecutive titles from 2004-2017.  The club regained the title in 2022, and also won the Lewis Shield and Oceanic Trophy competitions, the first time this "treble" has been achieved.

References

External links
 Official club site

English rugby union teams
Rugby clubs established in 1922
Rugby union in Northamptonshire
1922 establishments in England